Bjerringbro-Silkeborg Håndbold  is a handball club, based in the two Danish cities of Bjerringbro and Silkeborg. Currently, Bjerringbro-Silkeborg competes in the men's Danish Handball League. The home arena of the team is JYSK Arena.

History
The club was founded in 2005, when Bjerringbro FH and Silkeborg-Voel KFUM merged their first teams to create the new club. The mother club Bjerringbro FH won the silver medal of the Danish Handball League in 2002.

Results
Danish Handball League:
: 2016
: 2011, 2012, 2018, 2021
: 2010, 2015, 2017, 2022

Kits

Team

Current squad
Squad for the 2022–23 season

Goalkeeper
 1  Johan Sjöstrand
 16  Mikkel Løvkvist
Wingers
LW
 17  August Fridén
 23  Henrik Tilsted
RW
 4  Patrick Boldsen
 22  Aksel Horgen
Pivot
 14  Alexander Lynggaard
 19  René Toft Hansen
 44  Thomas Solstad

Back players
LB
 15  Mads Kjeldgaard Andersen
 20  William Bogojevic 
 25  Emil Jessen
CB
 2  Ludvig Hallbäck
RB
 7  Nikolaj Øris Nielsen (c)
 26  Peter Balling

Technical staff
 Head Coach:  Patrick Westerholm
 Assistant Coach:  Simon Sørensen

Transfers
Transfers for the 2023–24 season

Joining
  Mads Emil Lenbroch (LW) (from  Fredericia HK)
  Rasmus Lauge (CB) (from  Veszprém KC)

Leaving
  Henrik Tilsted (LW) (to  Mors-Thy Håndbold)
  Mads Kjeldgaard Andersen (LB) (to  Bergischer HC)
  Aksel Horgen (RW) (to  SG Flensburg-Handewitt)

European Handball

EHF Champions League

EHF Cup

EHF Cup Winners' Cup

Notable former players
Men

 Niklas Landin Jacobsen
 Jannick Green
 Rasmus Lauge Schmidt
 Henrik Toft Hansen
 Lars Krogh Jeppesen
 Casper U. Mortensen
 Morten Olsen
 Sebastian Frandsen
 Kasper Nielsen
 Mads Christiansen
 Sørenn Rasmussen
 Jesper Nøddesbo
 Mads Øris Nielsen
 Klaus Thomsen
 Michael V. Knudsen
 Andy Schmid
 Espen Lie Hansen
 Kristian Kjelling
 Fredrik Petersen
 Linus Persson
 Sigvaldi Guðjónsson
 Kári Kristjánsson
 Milutin Dragićević
 Aco Jonovski
 Miha Žvižej
 Sebastian Skube

See also 
Silkeborg-Voel KFUM

References

External links
 
 

Danish handball clubs
Silkeborg Municipality
Handball clubs established in 2005
2005 establishments in Denmark
Viborg Municipality